Cowart is a surname. Notable people with the surname include:

 Byron Cowart (born 1996), American football player
 Daniel Cowart, man suspected of a plot to assassinate Barack Obama in 2008
 Dax Cowart (born 1947), attorney noted for the ethical issues raised by efforts to sustain his life against his wishes
 Delma Cowart (1941–2021), American stock car racing driver
 Donald Cowart (born 1985), American steeplechase runner
Gwendolyne Cowart (1920–2003), American pilot during World War II
 Kaleb Cowart (born 1992), American baseball player
 Sam Cowart (born 1975), former American football linebacker
 Shea Cowart, American sprinter

See also
 A muscadine (Vitis rotundifolia) cultivar